Carlton is both a surname and a given name. Notable people with the name include:

Surname
 Bart Carlton, American basketball player
 Bronwyn Carlton (born 1962), American comic-book writer and radio DJ 
 Carl Carlton (born 1953), American R&B, soul, and funk singer and songwriter
 Danny Carlton (born 1983), English footballer
 Doyle E. Carlton (1885–1972), Governor of Florida
 Drew Carlton (born 1995), American baseball player
 J. Phil Carlton (born 1938), Associate Justice of the North Carolina Supreme Court
 Jim Carlton (1935–2015), Australian politician
 Larry Carlton (born 1948), studio guitarist best known for working with Steely Dan, the Crusaders and Joni Mitchell in the 1970s
 Steve Carlton (born 1944), professional baseball player (1965–88)
 Vanessa Carlton (born 1980), pop and rock singer, songwriter and pianist
 Vassar B. Carlton (1912–2005), Florida Supreme Court Justice
 Wray Carlton (born 1937), American collegiate football and American Football League player

Given name
 Carlton B. Ardery Jr. (died 1965), American test pilot
 Carlton Barrett (1950–1987), reggae drummer and percussion player; member of Bob Marley and The Wailers
 Carlton W. Barrett (1919–1986), US Army soldier and Medal of Honor recipient
 Carlton Cole (born 1983), English footballer
 Carlton Cuse (born 1959), American screenwriter and producer
 Carlton Davis (born 1996), American football player
 Carlton Fairweather (born 1961), English footballer
 Carlton Fisk (born 1947), professional baseball player (1969, 1971–1993)
 Carlton Foster (1826–1901), American politician
 Carlton Gary (1950-2018), American serial killer and rapist
 Cookie Gilchrist (1935–2011), American football player
 Carlton Haselrig (1966–2020), American wrestler and National Football League player
 Carlton Higbie (born 1983), author and former Navy SEAL
 Carlton Johnson (born 1969), American football player
 Carlton McCarthy ), aka Carlton (singer), English soul singer
 Carlton Martial (born 1999), American football player
 Carlton Morris (born 1995), English football player
 Carlton Palmer (born 1965), English international football player
 Carlton Skinner (1913–2004), Governor of Guam

Fictional characters
 Carlton Banks, from the American television series The Fresh Prince of Bel-Air, played by Alfonso Ribeiro and Olly Sholotan
 Carlton Lassiter, from the American television series Psych
 Carlton the doorman, on the American television show Rhoda and Carlton Your Doorman
 Johnny Cage (born John Carlton), from the Mortal Kombat video game series
 Carlton "Carl" Carlson, from the animated television series The Simpsons

See also
 Justice Carlton (disambiguation)
 Senator Carlton (disambiguation)

 Carlston (name)
 Carlon

English masculine given names
Surnames from given names